Dansby is a surname. Notable people with the surname include:

Karlos Dansby (born 1981), American football player
Michael Dansby (born 1983), American football player

See also
Dansby Cemetery, cemetery in Rusk County, Texas, United States
Dansby Swanson (born 1994), American baseball player